Renaissance is the 2nd studio album by Finnish thrash metal band Diablo. It debuted at #14 on the Finnish albums chart.

Track listing
 "Angel" - 4:22
 "Icon of Flesh" - 4:24
 "Tunnel of Pain" - 4:27
 "C22" - 3:49
 "Creatures of Deception" - 3:59
 "Hollow Point" - 4:30
 "Intomesee" - 3:48
 "Enemy" - 3:48
 "A Fear" - 4:00
 "Renaissance" - 4:08

Personnel 
 Rainer Nygård – Vocals, guitar
 Marko Utriainen – Guitar
 Aadolf Virtanen – Bass guitar
 Heikki Malmberg – Drums

References 

2002 albums
Diablo (band) albums